Fiorile is a 1993 Italian drama film about a family curse caused by greed. The film was directed by Paolo and Vittorio Taviani, and stars Claudio Bigagli, Galatea Ranzi, and Michael Vartan. It was entered into the 1993 Cannes Film Festival.

The title Fiorile allegedly is derived from the month of Floréal (April–May) in the French Republican Calendar. The film is also known as Wild Flower.

Plot
While travelling to visit their grandfather in Tuscany, two children are told the story of a family curse that has lasted two hundred years. During Napoleon's Italian invasion, Elisabetta Benedetti fell in love with French soldier Jean but while he was distracted by her, Elisabetta's brother Corrado unintentionally stole the regiment's gold that Jean was guarding, causing Jean's death by firing squad and set the curse in train. The Benedettis become wealthy, corrupt and hated by their former friends, who rename them the Maledetti, the 'cursed' (Benedetti means 'blessed'). The children's grandfather Massimo Benedetti is the last man to be directly affected by the curse but will he pass it onto them?

Cast
 Claudio Bigagli – Corrado / Alessandro
 Galatea Ranzi – Elisabette / Elisa
 Michael Vartan – Jean / Massimo
 Lino Capolicchio – Luigi
 Constanze Engelbrecht – Juliette
 Athina Cenci – Gina
 Giovanni Guidelli – Elio
 Norma Martelli – Livia
 Pier Paolo Capponi – Duilio
 Chiara Caselli – Chiara
 Renato Carpentieri – Massimo as an old Man
 Carlo Luca De Ruggieri – Renzo
 Laurent Schilling
 Fritz Müller-Scherz – University Professor
 Laura Scarimbolo – Alfredina

See also      
 List of Italian films of 1993

References

External links
 
 

1993 films
1993 drama films
1990s Italian-language films
1990s French-language films
Films directed by Paolo and Vittorio Taviani
Films scored by Nicola Piovani
1993 multilingual films
Italian multilingual films
French multilingual films
German multilingual films